Čechynce is a village and municipality in the Nitra District in western central Slovakia, in the Nitra Region.

History
In historical records the village was first mentioned in 1248.

Geography
The village lies at an altitude of 133 metres and covers an area of 5.861 km². It has a population of about 1030 people.

Ethnicity
The village is approximately 46% Slovak and 54% Magyar.

Facilities
The village has a public library and football pitch.

Genealogical resources

The records for genealogical research are available at the state archive "Statny Archiv in Nitra, Slovakia"

 Roman Catholic church records (births/marriages/deaths): 1701-1902 (parish B)
 Lutheran church records (births/marriages/deaths): 1887-1954 (parish B)

See also
 List of municipalities and towns in Slovakia

External links
http://www.statistics.sk/mosmis/eng/run.html
Surnames of living people in Cechynce

Villages and municipalities in Nitra District